Louise or Luise may refer to:

 Louise (given name)

Arts

Songs
 "Louise" (Bonnie Tyler song), 2005
 "Louise" (The Human League song), 1984
 "Louise" (Jett Rebel song), 2013
 "Louise" (Maurice Chevalier song), 1929
"Louise", by Clan of Xymox from the album Medusa
"Louise", by NOFX from the album Pump Up the Valuum
 "Louise", by Paul Revere & the Raiders from The Spirit of '67
 "Louise", by Paul Siebel from Woodsmoke and Oranges, covered by several artists
 "Louise", by Taylor Hawkins and the Coattail Riders from Taylor Hawkins and the Coattail Riders
"Louise", by The Yardbirds from the album Five Live Yardbirds

Other
 Louise (opera), an opera by Charpentier
 Louise (1939 film), a French film based on the opera
 Louise (2003 film), a Canadian animated short film by Anita Lebeau
 Louise (Take 2), a 1998 French film
 Louise Cake, part of New Zealand cuisine

Royalty 
 Louise of Savoy (1476–1531), mother to Francis I of France
 Louise of Mecklenburg-Strelitz (1776–1810), queen of Prussia
 Princess Louise of Prussia (1808–1870) was the third surviving daughter and ninth child of Frederick William III of Prussia and Louise of Mecklenburg-Strelitz.
 Princess Louise of Prussia (1838–1923), daughter of Wilhelm I of Germany
 Louise of Great Britain (1724–1751), youngest surviving daughter of George II of Great Britain and Caroline of Ansbach. Queen of Denmark and Norway from 1746 until her death, as the first wife of King Frederick V of Denmark.
 Louise of Hesse-Kassel (1817–1898), daughter of Prince William of Hesse and Charlotte of Denmark. A German princess by birth and in 1863 became the Queen to King Christian IX of Denmark.
 Louise of Mecklenburg-Güstrow (1667–1721) was Queen of Denmark and Norway as the first spouse of King Frederick IV of Denmark.
 Louise of Sweden (1851–1926) was Queen of Denmark as the spouse of King Frederick VIII of Denmark. She was the only daughter of King Charles XV of Sweden and Louise of the Netherlands.
 Louise of the Netherlands (1828–1871) was the Queen of Sweden and Norway as the spouse of King Charles XV of Sweden and IV of Norway. Her father was Prince Frederick of the Netherlands, the second child of King William I of the Netherlands and Wilhelmina of Prussia. Her mother Louise was the eighth child of King Frederick William III of Prussia and Louise of Mecklenburg-Strelitz.
Louise Mountbatten (1889–1965), Queen of Sweden as the second spouse of King Gustaf VI Adolf. Sister of Louis Mountbatten and Princess Alice of Greece and Denmark. Maternal aunt of Prince Philip, Duke of Edinburgh.
Lady Louise Windsor (born 2003) is the elder child and only daughter of Prince Edward, Duke of Edinburgh, and the Duchess of Edinburgh. She is the youngest granddaughter of Queen Elizabeth II and Prince Philip, Duke of Edinburgh. Louise is currently eleventh in the line of succession to succeed her grandmother.

Ships

 , a United States Navy patrol vessel in commission from  1917 to 1919
Louise (steamship), a steamship that operated on the Chesapeake Bay

See also
 Louiseville
 Princess Louise (disambiguation)
 Lake Louise (disambiguation)
 Louis (disambiguation)
 Louisa (disambiguation)